Eli Uzan (21 March 1963 – 23 November 2009) was an Israeli footballer who played for Hapoel Be'er Sheva, Hapoel Tel Aviv and Tzafririm Holon. He was of a Tunisian-Jewish descent.

Uzan began his career at Be'er Sheva during the 1980-81 season. In 1983, he was called up to the Israel national team's Olympics squad, playing a single match against Belgium. In 1984, he moved to Hapoel Tel Aviv, where he played until 1992. Between 1992 and 1994 he played for Tzafririm Holon.

In November 2009 Uzan was found dead in his car, it having crashed into a pole on Levi Eshkol Road in Beersheba. Police suspect that Uzan had been shot.

References

1963 births
2009 deaths
Male murder victims
Israeli footballers
Liga Leumit players
Hapoel Be'er Sheva F.C. players
Hapoel Tel Aviv F.C. players
Hapoel Tzafririm Holon F.C. players
Footballers from Beersheba
Israeli people of Tunisian-Jewish descent
Association football defenders